Genesis is a cryptocurrency brokerage for institutional investors. It is a subsidiary of Digital Currency Group (DCG).

Genesis operates several business lines, including Genesis Trading, Genesis Capital, and Genesis Prime. Genesis Trading provides over-the-counter (OTC) trading services for large-volume cryptocurrency transactions. Genesis Capital offers institutional lending services to clients who want to borrow or lend cryptocurrency. Genesis Prime provides trading and lending services to hedge funds, family offices, and other institutional investors.

Genesis filed for Chapter 11 bankruptcy on January 19, 2023 to request court protection to reorganize its cryptocurrency lending businesses.

History
Genesis Global Capital was founded in 2013. It is a subsidiary of the Digital Currency Group, a venture capital company founded by Barry Silbert.

Genesis is a crypto trading, lending, and asset custody platform, targeting institutional clients and high-net-worth individuals. They claim to have been the first OTC Bitcoin crypto desk, launched in 2013.

Genesis acquired the London-based crypto asset custodian company Volt in early 2020. Grayscale Investments' crypto assets were held by Xapo, which Coinbase bought in 2019. After the Volt acquisition, Genesis moved its crypto custody from Coinbase to Greyscale.

In early July 2022, Genesis' parent company Digital Currency Group (DCG) took on some of Genesis' debts to keep the company afloat after it was left exposed to hundreds of millions of dollars in losses from loans to Singapore-based crypto lender Babel Finance and the bankrupt crypto hedge fund, Three Arrows Capital (3AC). 

Former CEO Michael Moro stepped down from his post on August 17, 2022. Genesis COO Derar Islim assumed the role of interim CEO.

In November 2022, the company revealed that it had $2.8 billion in outstanding loans. The company hired investment bank Moelis & Company to assist in restructuring. The options the company was considering at the time included declaring bankruptcy. In the same month, Barron's reported that Genesis was under investigation by state securities regulators.

On January 12, 2023, the Securities and Exchange Commission charged Genesis Global Capital with the unregistered offer and sale of securities to retail investors through Gemini Trust Company’s Gemini Earn crypto asset lending program. The SEC is seeking permanent injunctive relief, disgorgement of ill-gotten gains plus prejudgment interest, and civil penalties against both Gemini and Genesis.

On January 19, 2023, Genesis filed for Chapter 11 bankruptcy protection to reorganize three of Genesis' holding companies, all involved in the cryptocurrency lending business. Genesis listed over 100,000 creditors with aggregate liabilities in the range of US$1.2–11 billion dollars. The company stated that Genesis' derivatives and spot trading business were not a part of the bankruptcy filing and continue operating.  Entities involved in the bankruptcy are Genesis Global Holdco, LLC, Genesis Global Capital, LLC, and Genesis Asia Pacific Pte. Ltd.

On February 6, 2023, Genesis Global Holdco announced an agreement in principle with DCG and creditors of Genesis Global Capital. The agreement, which is subject to bankruptcy court approval, will see DCG give its equity interest in Genesis Global Trading (GGT) to Genesis Global Holdco. DCG will also refinance its loans from Genesis and exchange its existing $1.1 billion promissory note for convertible preferred stock issued by DCG.

References

American companies established in 2013
Companies that filed for Chapter 11 bankruptcy in 2023
Cryptocurrency companies